Biblica, formerly International Bible Society, was founded in 1809 and is the worldwide copyright holder of the New International Version of the Bible (NIV), licensing commercial rights to Zondervan in the United States and to Hodder & Stoughton in the United Kingdom. Biblica is also a member of the Forum of Bible Agencies International and Every Tribe Every Nation.

History 

Biblica was founded December 4, 1809, in New York City as the New York Bible Society by a small group including  Henry Rutgers, William Colgate, Theodorus Van Wyke and Thomas Eddy.

Biblica experienced its first merger in 1819 when it merged with the New York Auxiliary Bible Society. It was renamed New York International Bible Society in 1974, International Bible Society (IBS) in 1988. The organization moved to Colorado Springs from New York in 1988 and moved into its current facility in 1989. It merged with Living Bibles International in 1992 and International Bible Society and Send the Light (STL) in 2007, forming a new organization called IBS-STL. In 2009, it adopted the name Biblica.

Translations 
Biblica's international ministry began in 1810 with its sponsorship of William Carey’s Bible translation work in India. The worldwide work expanded in 1992 following the merger with Living Bibles International, through which Biblica developed its global translation ministry. The reach of Biblica around the world again expanded through its merger with Send the Light (STL) in 2007.

Biblica is perhaps best known for its New International Version (NIV) version of the Bible, the best-selling contemporary English translation.

See also 
 Bible society
 New International Version
 Zondervan

References

External links 
 

Bible societies
Religious organizations established in 1809
Religion in Colorado Springs, Colorado
Christianity in Colorado
Organizations based in Colorado Springs, Colorado
Christian organizations established in the 19th century
1809 establishments in the United States